Violeta Strămăturaru (born May 5, 1988) is a Romanian luger who has competed since 2001. Her older sister Raluca Strămăturaru is also a luger.

Strămăturaru best Luge World Cup season finish was 32nd in women's singles in 2008-09. She qualified for the 2010 Winter Olympics. After an accident at the 2010 Winter Olympics she suffered a concussion and when she recovered decided to withdraw from the Olympic Luge competition.

References
 FIL-Luge profile

External links
 

1988 births
Living people
Romanian female lugers